The Blending is a fantasy series by Sharon Green.  There are five novels in The Blending series, and an additional three novels in The Blending Enthroned.  The covers for all the books were illustrated by Thomas Canty.

Convergence: Book One of The Blending, Avon, November 1996
Competitions: Book Two of The Blending, Avon, March 1997
Challenges: Book Three of The Blending, Avon, May 1998
Betrayals: Book Four of The Blending, Avon, February 1999
Prophecy: Book Five of The Blending, Avon, July 1999
Intrigues: Book One of The Blending Enthroned, Eos, October 3, 2000
Deceptions: Book Two of The Blending Enthroned
Destiny: Book Three of The Blending Enthroned, Eos, April 2, 2002

Overview
Every twenty-five years, those with magical talents, called adepts, compete for a position within The Blending, a group of five adepts who rule the land.  Tamrissa (the Fire adept), Lorand (the Earth adept), Jovvi (Spirit), Clarion (the Air), and Vallant (the Water) combine into The Blending, but another group of adepts attempt to usurp the position for themselves.

References

External links
 Review by Robert Francis of SF Site
 Interview with Green at Crescent Blues

Fantasy novel series